Marie-Thérèse d'Alverny (25 January 1903 – 26 April 1991) was a French librarian and historian.

Biography 
After studies at the École nationale des chartes and the École pratique des hautes études, d'Alverny joined the staff of the Bibliothèque nationale de France in 1947. From 1957 she taught at the Centre d'études supérieures de civilisation médiévale in Poitiers. In 1962 she was appointed to the Centre national de la recherche scientifique. She was elected to the American Philosophical Society in 1974 and the American Academy of Arts and Sciences in 1976. In 1989, she received an honorary doctorate from the Jagiellonian University. For additional honours, d'Alverny joined the International Academy of the History of Science in 1960 before becoming a full member in 1965. In 1966, d'Alverny was named a Corresponding Fellow of the British Academy.

Bibliography 

 Les traductions des philosophes arabes, Tipografia del senato del Dott, 1954, 9 p.
 Récréations monastiques: les couteaux à manche d'ivoire, 1955, 32 p.
 Le symbolisme de la sagesse et le Christ de Saint Dunstan, 1st ed. 1956, Variorum, 1993, 332 p., 
 Un nouveau manuscrit des "tabulae mechlinenses" d'Henri Bate de Malines, 1956, 4 p.
 Les anges et les jours, 1957, 32 p.
 Catalogue général des manuscrits latins, nos 3014–3277, Volume 4, Bibliothèque nationale, 1958, 492 p.
 "Aristotelismo padovano e filosofia aristotelica", Atti del XII Congresso internazionale di filosofia, 1960
 Survivance et renaissance d'Avicenne à Venise et à Padoue, 1961
 Catalogue des manuscrits en écriture latine portant des indications de date, de lieu ou de copiste, 1962
 Une baguette magique, 1964
 Les mystères de l'église, d'après Pierre de Roissy, 1966
 Un sermon d'Alain de Lille sur la misère de l'homme, 1966
 Astrologues et théologiens au xiie siècle, 1967
 Maître Alain, "nova et vetera", 1968
 Les traductions d'Aristote et de ses commentateurs, 1968
 Avicennisme en Italie, 1971
 Un adversaire de saint Thomas: Petrus Iohannis Olivi, 1974
 Algazel dans l'Occident latin, 1974
 Survivances du "système d'Héraclide" au Moyen Âge, 1975
 L'homme comme symbole: le microcosme, 1976
 "Les nouveaux apports dans les domaines de la science et de la pensée au temps de Philippe Auguste: la philosophie", in La France de Philippe Auguste, le temps des mutations, 1980
 Translations and translators, 1982
 Remarques sur la tradition manuscrite de la "Summa alexandrinorum", 1983
 "Alain de Lille et l'Islam: le Contra Paganos", dans Islam et chrétiens du Midi (xiie-xive s.) (Cahiers de Fanjeaux; 18), 1983
 Pietro d'Abano traducteur de Galien, 1985
 Utilité et limites des répertoires et catalogues spécialisés de manuscrits médiévaux, 1986
 Pseudo-Aristotle, "De elementis", 1986
 "Les traductions à deux interprètes, d'arabe en langue vernaculaire et de langue vernaculaire en latin", in Traductions et traducteurs au Moyen Âge, Actes du colloque international du CNRS, IRHT, 1989, .
 (with Charles Burnett) Pensée médiévale en Occident: théologie, magie et autres textes des xiie-xiiie siècles, Variorum, 1995, 339 p.

References 

 Guy Beaujouan, "Marie-Thérèse d'Alverny (1903-1991)", Bibliothèque de l'École des chartes, vol. 150, no 2, 1992, p. 439–442.
 Giles Constable, "Marie-Thérèse D'Alverny (25 January 1903-26 April 1991)", Proceedings of the American Philosophical Society, 136(3) (September 1992), p. 419–422.
 Malgorzata-Hanna Malewicz, Jean Jolivet, Charles-S.-F. Burnett and Jean Vezin, "Marie-Thérèse d'Alverny (1903-1991)", Cahiers de civilisation médiévale, vol. 35, no 139, 1992, p. 287–293.

1903 births
1991 deaths
French women historians
French librarians
French medievalists
Corresponding Fellows of the British Academy
Chevaliers of the Légion d'honneur
20th-century French historians
Members of the American Philosophical Society
French women librarians